Half of a Yellow Sun is a 2013 Anglo-Nigerian drama film directed by Biyi Bandele and based on the novel of the same name by Chimamanda Ngozi Adichie. The film is historical fiction that follows two sisters who are caught up in the outbreak of the Nigerian Civil War.

It stars Chiwetel Ejiofor, Thandiwe Newton, Onyeka Onwenu, Anika Noni Rose, Joseph Mawle, Genevieve Nnaji, OC Ukeje and John Boyega and was filmed on location in Nigeria. The film premiered in the Special Presentation section at the 2013 Toronto International Film Festival. It received mixed reception from critics.

Plot
Half of a Yellow Sun begins during the first Nigerian Independence Day on 1 October 1960 and concludes at the end of the Nigerian Civil War in 1970. The film is interspersed with archival stock footage of television news broadcasts of political events in Nigeria. 
 
After completing their university education in the United Kingdom and United States, twin sisters Olanna (Thandiwe Newton) and Kainene (Anika Noni Rose) return to Nigeria. Their father is the Igbo Chief Ozobia (Zack Orji), a wealthy businessman who owns assets in Port Harcourt. Spurning an offer to marry Finance Minister Festus Okotie-Eboh, Olanna decides to move in with her lover, the "revolutionary professor" Odenigbo (Chiwetel Ejiofor), who teaches at the university in the Nigerian city of Nsukka. Meanwhile, Kainene takes over the family interests and pursues a career as a businesswoman, falling in love with Richard Churchill (Joseph Mawle), an English writer.

At Nsukka University, Olanna finds work as a sociology lecturer and befriends Odenigbo's houseboy, Ugwu (John Boyega). However, Olanna faces hostility from Odenigbo's mother "Mama" (Onyeka Onwenu), who distrusts the highly educated Olanna and considers her a witch. Disapproving of her son's relationship with Olanna, "Mama" plies Odenigbo with alcohol and arranges for her servant Amala (Susan Wokoma) to have a one-night stand with him. A devastated Olanna wants to break off the relationship, but her Aunt Ifeka (Gloria Young) convinces her to return to Nsukka.

Despite having a one-night stand with Richard, Olanna and Odenigbo reconcile and agree to raise Amala's infant daughter as their own child. The child is named Chiamaka but they call her "Baby." After falling out with Kainene, Richard returns to London. While waiting at the airport, he witnesses Northern Nigerian soldiers slaughtering Igbo civilians in the build-up to the Nigerian Civil War. Meanwhile, Olanna is caught up in a race riot and barely escapes with her life. As ethnic tensions build up, Olanna and her family flee Kano and resettle in Abba in Biafra. After reconciling with "Mama", Olanna decides to remain in Nigeria and marry Odenigbo.

While Biafra declares independence, Richard returns from London to work with his lover Kainene, who has become a war profiteer, importing arms to Biafra. The fighting forces Olanna and her family to evacuate to Umuahia. During the wedding reception, Olanna and her family narrowly escape a Nigerian bombing raid. As the civil war drags on, Olanna and her family relocate to a refugee camp where she reunites with her sister Kainene, who has experienced a change of heart and helps to run the refugee camp. Ugwu is later conscripted as a Biafran child soldier.

As time passes by, Olanna and Odenigbo befriend Kainene and Richard. With the refugee camp running low on supplies due to the civil war, Kainene decides to travel into Nigerian territory in order to trade with local peasants despite Odenigbo's warnings. Several days pass by and Kainene fails to return. While Olanna and Richard fail to find Kainene, they are relieved to learn that Ugwu has survived the war and welcome him back to the family. Following the defeat of Biafra, Richard continues his search for Kainene while Olanna, Odenigbo, Ugwu, and "Baby" rebuild their lives.

The post-script mentions that Kainene was never found while Richard moved back to Nsukka. Olanna and Odenigbo remained married for nearly fifty years while Ugwu became a writer. Their daughter Chiamaka (aka "Baby") becomes a medical doctor.

Cast

Production
Half of a Yellow Sun was shot across five weeks in Tinapa Studio, Calabar and Creek Town, Nigeria. Bandele lists malaria and typhoid as two of the major challenges of the shoot, with several members of the cast and crew becoming ill, including star Thandiwe Newton.

Music inspired by the film
In February 2014, it was announced that D'banj would release a track titled "Bother You", a song inspired by the film, to coincide with the release of the film. D'banj was inspired to record "Bother You" after watching the film. The music video for the song includes images from the film.

Reception

Critical response 
Half of a Yellow Sun received a mixed reception from critics. It currently has a 51% aggregate rating on Rotten Tomatoes based on 53 reviews, with a 5.53 out of 10 average score. The site's consensus states: "While it doesn't quite do justice to the source material, Half of a Yellow Sun adapts Chimamanda Ngozi Adichie's novel with committed performances and narrative nuance". Leslie Felperin of The Hollywood Reporter writes that it "is the kind of ambitious literary adaptation that wants it all kinds of ways, not all of them compatible" and that "the script is studded with great leaden lumps of expository dialogue". Nollywood Reinvented says the film is nowhere as good as the book, but points out that "Even though the movie does not recreate the emotions of the book it creates its own emotions". It also says that "The movie builds on amazing sets, actors, supporting actors and music", but the characters lack depth. Peter Bradshaw of The Guardian gave Half of a Yellow Sun 2 out of 5 stars, also commenting that "there is a heartfelt quality" but that "unfortunately, the film is often stately and sluggish with some very daytime-soapy moments of emotional revelation. At other times, it looks more like a filmed theatrical piece".

Adichie's reception 
Adichie was happy about the final product of the film, as she thought it was beautiful and very well done. She also said the acting was very good and she loved the fact that it was filmed in Nigeria, which was her only requirement.

Box office 
Half of a Yellow Sun became the highest grossing Nigerian film, until it was overtaken by The Wedding Party.

See also
 List of Nigerian films of 2013

References

External links
 
 
 

2010s English-language films
2010s historical drama films
2010s British films
2013 drama films
2013 films
2013 war drama films
Black British cinema
Black British mass media
Black British films
British historical drama films
British war drama films
English-language Nigerian films
Films based on Nigerian novels
Films directed by Biyi Bandele
Films set in Eastern Nigeria
Films set in the 1960s
Films shot in Calabar
Nigerian drama films
Nigerian films based on actual events
Tinapa Studios films
War films based on actual events